Johnsonville may refer to:

Geography

Australia 
 Johnsonville, Victoria

New Zealand 
 Johnsonville, New Zealand

United States 
 Johnsonville, Alabama
 Johnsonville, California, former name of Bear Valley, Mariposa County, California
 Johnsonville, Illinois
 Johnsonville, Indiana
 Johnsonville, New York
 Johnsonville, South Carolina
 Johnsonville, Tennessee, a former town replaced by New Johnsonville, Tennessee
 Johnsonville, Wisconsin, an incorporated village
 Johnsonville Township, Minnesota
 Johnsonville Village, Connecticut, an abandoned ghost town

Company 
 Johnsonville Foods is a sausage maker in Johnsonville, Wisconsin

History 
 Battle of Johnsonville

See also
Johnstonville